Thicker than Water is a short film starring Laurel and Hardy, directed by James W.Horne, produced by Hal Roach, and released in 1935 by Metro-Goldwyn-Mayer. The short also features James Finlayson and Daphne Pollard in supporting roles. It was the last two-reel comedy starring the comedy team, as Hal Roach decided to end Laurel and Hardy short films and move them solely into feature films.

Plot
Stan and Ollie are ordered to wash the dishes by Ollie's wife (in the first film-title pun-gag, Stan pours too much liquid-detergent into the dishpan, causing the resulting washing-solution to be "much thicker than water") but Stan dries them and puts them back in the washbowl. Ollie then tells him to put them somewhere dry and he places them on a gas ring where they heat up, so that when Ollie picks them up he drops them and they all smash. James Finlayson then calls to collect payment for some furniture. Stan, Ollie and Mrs. Hardy embark on a lengthy "the money that you gave to him, to give to me to pay him" dialogue routine. At Stan's suggestion Ollie then withdraws the couple's savings from the bank to buy furniture and inadvertently pays virtually the whole amount at an auction for a grandfather clock which is soon crushed under a passing truck. Awaiting the wrath of Mrs. Hardy back at home he tells Stan that "here is another nice kettle of fish you've pickled me in".

Mrs. Hardy then causes serious injuries to Ollie when she hits him over the head with a frying pan, requiring him to be rushed to hospital for a blood transfusion. The doctor conscripts Stan to be the unwilling blood donor ("what do you think I am, a blood worm?"). During the transfusion, the blood-transferring equipment malfunctions and too much blood is pumped out of Stan and into Ollie, requiring some of the blood inside Ollie to be pumped into Stan. But too much blood gets pumped back into Stan, requiring another reversal, and so forth ... until the transfusion machine explodes. This sets up the climactic sight gag: when Laurel and Hardy exit the hospital they appear to have morphed into each other. Ollie is minus his toothbrush mustache and wearing Stan's hat and bow-tie, while Stan is wearing Ollie's hat, necktie and mustache. The two comedians proceed to do spot-on imitations of each other's mannerisms. Ollie mimes Stan's famous befuddled head scratch while an exasperated Stan twiddles his tie in response and delivers Ollie's signature catchphrase, "Here's another nice mess you've gotten me into!" (in Hardy's dubbed voice). Ollie reacts by breaking into Stan's trademark cry for the comic fadeout. And after they said their goodbyes to the doctors as they leave the hospital, Oliver (as Stan) told Stan (as Oliver) "Wait a minute, I forgot something!" And it was pulling the end title screen.

Cast

Production notes
At three points in the film, Laurel and Hardy drag the next scene into the frame from off-camera. This effect was achieved with the optical-printing device known as a wipe.

References

External links
 
 

1935 films
1935 comedy films
American black-and-white films
Films directed by James W. Horne
Laurel and Hardy (film series)
American comedy short films
1935 short films
1930s American films